is a Christmas song and the 27th single by Japanese singer/songwriter Chisato Moritaka. Written by Moritaka, the single was released by One Up Music on December 1, 1995. The song is a modified version of "Gin Gin Gin", which Moritaka wrote for a Suntory Ice Gin commercial. The first B-side is "Gin Gin Gingle Bell", which was used for the Suntory Ice Gin Christmas commercial that year. The second B-side is Moritaka's cover of "Ichigatsu Ichijitsu", a popular Japanese New Year's Day song.

Chart performance 
"Jin Jin Jingle Bell" peaked at No. 2 on Oricon's singles chart and sold 253,000 copies. It was also certified Gold by the RIAJ.

Other versions 
Moritaka re-recorded the song and uploaded the video on her YouTube channel on December 1, 2012. This version is also included in Moritaka's 2013 self-covers DVD album Love Vol. 3. Moritaka uploaded different self-covers of the song annually until 2016.

The song was remixed by tofubeats in the 2014 collaboration album Chisato Moritaka with tofubeats: Moritaka Tofu.

Track listing 
All songs are written by Chisato Moritaka, except where indicated; all music is arranged by Yuichi Takahashi.

Personnel 
 Chisato Moritaka – vocals, drums
 Yasuaki Maejima – piano, Fender Rhodes
 Masafumi Yokoyama – bass
 Yuichi Takahashi – guitar, keyboard, programming
 Yukio Seto – guitar

Chart positions

Certification

Nozomi Sasaki version 

Japanese model and singer Nozomi Sasaki covered "Jin Jin Jingle Bell" as her second single on November 24, 2010. This version features rap lyrics by Pentaphonic. The single peaked at No. 29 on Oricon's singles chart.

Track listing 
All lyrics are written by Chisato Moritaka and Pentaphonic; all music is composed by Moritaka and Masaru Iwabuchi; all music is arranged by Iwabuchi.
CD

DVD
"Jin Jin Jingle Bell" (Music video)

Chart positions

Super Girls version 

Japanese idol group Super Girls (performing as ) covered "Jin Jin Jingle Bell" as their eighth single on December 4, 2013. The single peaked at No. 10 on Oricon's singles chart and sold 12,137 copies.

Track listing 
CD + DVD

CD Single

CD Single [Event Venue / mu-mo Shop Limited Edition]

Chart positions

Other cover versions 
 Runa Miyoshida covered the song on her 2021 Christmas EP Flowers of Love: X'mas Ska.

References

External links 
Chisato Moritaka
 
 

Nozomi Sasaki
 
 

1995 singles
1995 songs
2010 singles
2013 singles
Japanese-language songs
Japanese Christmas songs
Chisato Moritaka songs
Songs with lyrics by Chisato Moritaka
One Up Music singles
Avex Group singles
SME Records singles